Velike Lipljene is a settlement in the Municipality of Grosuplje in central Slovenia. It lies in the hills south of Grosuplje on the road from Šent Jurij to Turjak. The area is part of the historical region of Lower Carniola. The municipality is now included in the Central Slovenia Statistical Region.

Cultural heritage
Part of a Roman period burial ground has been discovered near the settlement.

Attractions

Mayor Cave is located on the northern edge of the settlement's territory. It was discovered by the local mayor, Josip Perme, in 1926. It was opened as a show cave in 1927 and outfitted with electric lights after the Second World War.

Mass grave
Velike Lipljene is the site of a mass grave associated with the Second World War. The Velike Lipljene Mass Grave is located on the west side of the village on the slope of Medvejca Hill. It contains the remains of undetermined victims.

Gallery

References

External links

 Velike Lipljene on Geopedia

Populated places in the Municipality of Grosuplje